Tessa Albertson is an American actress. She plays Caitlin Miller on the television series Younger.

Early life 

Albertson was born in New York City. After high school graduation, she took time off for her acting career before attending Princeton University.

Career 
In 2008, Albertson got the role of Alice in the movie Phoebe in Wonderland opposite Elle Fanning and Bailee Madison. 

In 2012, she played the role of Isabella in the Henry Alex Rubin's drama movie, Disconnect opposite Jason Bateman and Hope Davis. 

In 2014, she starred in the pilot Bambi Cottages beside Molly Shannon and Paul F. Tompkins. She played the role of Veronica Burke. The same year, she was announced in the casting of the new series Younger by Darren Star, the creator of Sex and the City, a sitcom broadcast on TV Land. She plays the role of Caitlin Miller, Liza's daughter. 

In 2015, she acted in two movies, including 3 Generations opposite Elle Fanning and Naomi Watts. In 2016, the actress played Tilda in the movie Complete Unknown opposite Michael Shannon and Rachel Weisz. She also acted in the musical Shrek The Musical, playing Princess Fiona. In 2017, Albertson played Alex Faustner in the drama film November Criminals, opposite Chloë Grace Moretz and Ansel Elgort.

Filmography

Film

Television

References

External links 
 

American television actresses
Actresses from New York City
Living people
American film actresses
Princeton University alumni
21st-century American actresses
Year of birth missing (living people)